Lot 7 is a township in Prince County, Prince Edward Island, Canada. Lot 7 was awarded to Sir James Montgomery, 1st Baronet in the 1767 land lottery. It is part of Egmont Parish. Its shores bring in lobster and sea glass. A primarily Irish community.

Communities

Incorporated municipalities:

 none

Civic address communities:

 Burton
 Campbellton
 Cape Wolfe
 Forestview
 Glengarry
 Haliburton
 Knutsford
 Springfield West
 West Cape

References

07
Geography of Prince County, Prince Edward Island